This is the article about the Canadian novel. For the 2016 Tyler Perry TV series, see Too Close to Home (TV series).

Too Close to Home is a novel written by Canadian author Linwood Barclay, the author of the Richard & Judy Summer read winner "No Time For Goodbye".

Summary

When the Cutter family's next-door-neighbours, the Langleys, are gunned down in their house one hot July night, the Cutters' world is turned upside down. Could the killers have gone to the wrong house? At first the idea seems crazy, but gradually we discover that each of the Cutter family has a secret they'd rather keep buried.

References

Novels by Linwood Barclay
2008 Canadian novels